Charles Guené (born 6 April 1952) is a French politician and a member of the Senate of France. He represents the Haute-Marne department and is a member of The Republicans Party.

References
Page on the Senate website

1952 births
Living people
People from Puteaux
Union for a Popular Movement politicians
The Republicans (France) politicians
Gaullism, a way forward for France
French Senators of the Fifth Republic
Senators of Haute-Marne
Politicians from Île-de-France